The Indianapolis Greyhounds are the college football team that represents the University of Indianapolis and plays its home games at the Key Stadium in Indianapolis, Indiana. Indianapolis is a member of the Great Lakes Valley Conference.

Playoffs

NCAA Division III
The Greyhounds, then still known as the Indiana Central Greyhounds, made one appearance in the NCAA Division III football playoffs, with a combined record of 0-1.

NCAA Division II 
The Greyhounds have made seven appearances in the NCAA Division II playoffs, with a combined record of 2–7.

References

External links
 

 
American football teams established in 1924
1924 establishments in Indiana